Hard Drivin is a driving simulation video game developed by Atari Games in 1989. It invites players to test drive a sports car on courses that emphasize stunts and speed. The game features one of the first 3D polygon driving environments via a simulator cabinet with a force feedback steering wheel and a custom rendering architecture. According to the in-game credit screen, Hard Drivin''' was designed by two teams working concurrently in the United States and Ireland.Hard Drivin was released in arcades in February 1989 at a time when 3D graphics of any kind were rare, and driving games were largely implemented with scaled 2D sprites and filled-polygon graphics. It was the second commercially released arcade racing game to use 3D polygons; with Namco's Winning Run being the first, released two months earlier in December 1988.

In total, there are fifteen variations of the arcade unit. The eleven cockpit and four compact machines include various British, German, and Japanese versions.

Gameplay

Players drive a sports car in a first-person perspective, navigating one or two laps around a stunt track to get the best time, all the while avoiding obstacles and stage hazards such as other vehicles. In certain modes, if the player scored in the top 10, the player races against the computer-controlled car, Phantom Photon.

There is also a manual transmission mode which includes a clutch pedal and the possibility of stalling the car, along with a force feedback steering wheel, in which the driver would have to operate the car as they would in real life.

While driving, the player's progress is tracked by invisible waypoints, denoted by flags on the course map showing the player's progress when the game ends due to time running out. Passing the waypoint half-way through the track grants the player extra time.

After crashing (either into another vehicle or missing an airborne landing), a ten second "Instant Replay" animation plays showing a wide aerial view of the player's movement and surrounding vehicles leading up to the crash. Following the replay, the player's car is placed back on the track at the last waypoint passed, which may be a significant distance from the point of collision. If the player's car goes off-road, they have ten seconds to return to the track, or else they will be stopped and returned, at a standstill, to the last waypoint passed.Hard Drivin was one of the first arcade games to allow for more than three initials on the high-score board, which players could use to construct sentences on the score board.

Development
The 3D computer graphics arcade hardware that was eventually used for Hard Drivin began development in the mid-1980s, several years before the game was released. At the time, Atari Games was owned by Namco, and the two companies began working on a 3D arcade system. After Atari and Namco went separate ways, each company developed their own arcade system in the late 1980s, based on the same prototype. Atari used an earlier version of the hardware for Hard Drivin, while Namco developed a more advanced version of the hardware called the Namco System 21, which they used for Winning Run (1988).

The development of Hard Drivin began in 1988. Atari also originally intended to release the game in 1988. However, according to one of Atari's engineers and designers, it was delayed due to the dispute from its Vice President claiming that no one would buy an arcade cabinet for $10,000 after The Last Starfighter arcade game was cancelled for that same reason a few years earlier. After weeks of research, it was decided that $10,000 was an acceptable price point.

In addition to the main CPU, Hard Drivin uses two TMS34010 32-bit graphics-oriented processors and a digital signal processor.

Physics
The engine, transmission control, suspension, and tire physics were modeled in conjunction with Doug Milliken who was listed as a test driver in the game credits. In the 1950s his father William Milliken of Milliken Research led a team at Cornell Aeronautical Laboratory in Buffalo NY USA (later Calspan) that converted aircraft equations of motion to equations of motion for the automobile, and became one of the world's leading experts in car modeling.

Ports
The contemporary home systems Hard Drivin''' was ported to had tremendously less computing power than the arcade machine. These include the Amstrad CPC, Mega Drive / Genesis, and Atari Lynx. The Commodore 64 version was only released as part of the Wheels of Fire compilation. A version for the NES was programmed by Mark Morris, but was unreleased; a ROM of the game can be found online.

Reception

Atari sold 3,318 Hard Drivin arcade cabinets. In Japan, Game Machine listed Hard Drivin on their June 1, 1989 issue as being the second most successful upright/cockpit arcade cabinet of the month. It went on to become Japan's sixth highest-grossing dedicated arcade game of 1990. On Hong Kong's Bondeal charts, it topped the dedicated arcade cabinet chart in November 1989. The Spectrum version of the game rose to number 2 in the UK sales charts, behind Gazza's Superstar Soccer.

Nick Kelly of Commodore User reviewed the arcade version and said: "Hard Drivin' is exactly what its name suggests — difficult. You won't master this quickly, and if you aren't used to driving a car it's going to be very tough for you indeed. But Atari can be proud of themselves for producing a coin-op which really does put you in the driving seat, and that is undeniably a major first."Zzap!64 magazine regarded the Commodore 64 port as one of the worst C64 games of all time—criticizing the monochrome graphics, painful slowdown, and the lack of instant replays that were present in the other 8-bit conversions. The magazine gave the game 20%. In Japan, the Mega Drive version received a score of 30 out of 40 from a panel of four reviewers.

AccoladesYour Sinclair listed it as the best arcade game of 1989. Computer and Video Games listed it as the fourth best arcade game of 1989. The home computer ports received the Best Coin-Op Conversion prize at the 1989 Golden Joystick Awards. Crash gave it a Crash Smash award. The Games Machine gave it a Star Player award.

Legacy
In 2004 Hard Drivin was released for the GameCube, PlayStation 2 and Xbox as part of the Midway Arcade Treasures 2 collection.

The PC games Stunt Driver and Stunts, borrow many elements from Hard Drivin and both games are similar to each other.

Sequels
Race Drivin' (1990, arcade)
Hard Drivin' II - Drive Harder (1991, Atari ST, Amiga, DOS)
Hard Drivin's Airborne (1993) (unreleased)
Street Drivin (1993) (unreleased)

References

External links

Hard Drivin at Arcade History
''Hard Drivin''' at Atari Mania

1989 video games
Amiga games
Amstrad CPC games
Arcade video games
Atari arcade games
Atari Lynx games
Atari ST games
Cancelled Xbox games
Commodore 64 games
Domark games
DOS games
Golden Joystick Award winners
NuFX games
Racing simulators
Sega Genesis games
Tengen (company) games
Video games developed in Ireland
Video games developed in the United Kingdom
Video games developed in the United States
Video games scored by Alex Rudis
ZX Spectrum games